= Lycopus (spider) =

Scientific classification
- Domain: Eukaryota
- Kingdom: Animalia
- Phylum: Arthropoda
- Subphylum: Chelicerata
- Class: Arachnida
- Order: Araneae
- Infraorder: Araneomorphae
- Family: Thomisidae
- Genus: Lycopus; Thorell, 1895

Type species
- L. edax Thorell, 1895

Species
- 10, see text

Genus of spiders

Lycopus is a genus of Asian crab spiders first described by Tamerlan Thorell in 1895.

== Species ==
As of September 2022 it contains ten species:

- Lycopus atypicus Strand, 1911 — Indonesia (Moluccas), New Guinea
- Lycopus bangalores (Tikader, 1963) — India
- Lycopus cha Tang & Li, 2010 — China
- Lycopus edax Thorell, 1895 — Myanmar
- Lycopus kochi Kulczyński, 1911 — New Guinea
- Lycopus longissimus Tang & Li, 2010 — China
- Lycopus primus Tang & Li, 2009 — China
- Lycopus rubropictus Workman, 1896 — Singapore
- Lycopus tabulatus Tang & Li, 2010 — China
- Lycopus trabeatus Simon, 1895 — India
